Großenehrich is a town and a former municipality in the Kyffhäuserkreis district, in Thuringia, Germany. It is situated 13 km south of Sondershausen, and 34 km northwest of Erfurt. Since January 2021 it is part of the town Greußen.

References

Kyffhäuserkreis
Former municipalities in Thuringia